Shijing / Shih-ching may refer to:

Literary works:
 "Stone classics" (石經, Shijing), various sets of important literary works carved in stone, such as the Kaicheng Stone Classics

Places (石井):
 Shijing River in Fujian, on whose estuary the town of Shijing is located
 Shijing Township, Mancheng County, Hebei
 Shijing Township, Shangyi County, Hebei
 Shijing Township, Shijiazhuang, in Luquan, Hebei
 Shijing Township, Anhui, in Huaining County
 Shijing Subdistrict, Guangzhou, in Baiyun District
 Shijing Subdistrict, Jilin City, in Fengman District
 Shijing Subdistrict, Shenzhen, in Pingshan District

Towns
 Shijing, Fujian, a town in Nan'an, Quanzhou, Fujian
 Shijing, Henan, in Xin'an County
 Shijing, Loudi (石井镇),  a town of Louxing District, Loudi City, Hunan.
 Shijing, Shaanxi, in Hu County
 Shijing, Shandong, in Fei County